Pollock Run is a  long 2nd order tributary to the Youghiogheny River in Allegheny County, Pennsylvania. This is the only stream of this name in the United States.

Course
Pollock Run rises at Rankins Corners, Pennsylvania in Westmoreland County, and then flows southeast and then turns north to join the Youghiogheny River just into Allegheny County at Smithdale.

Watershed
Pollock Run drains  of area, receives about 39.7 in/year of precipitation, has a wetness index of 335.80, and is about 40% forested.

Natural History
Pollock Run is the location of Pollock Run Slopes BDA, which contains a remnant Mesic Central Forest community and a rare plant species.

References

 
Tributaries of the Ohio River
Rivers of Pennsylvania
Rivers of Allegheny County, Pennsylvania
Rivers of Westmoreland County, Pennsylvania
Allegheny Plateau